Scaurini is a tribe of darkling beetles in the family Tenebrionidae. There are at least 4 genera in Scaurini.

Genera
These genera belong to the tribe Scaurini:
 Carchares Pascoe, 1887  (tropical Africa)
 Cephalostenus Solier, 1838  (the Palearctic)
 Herpiscius Solier, 1838  (tropical Africa)
 Scaurus Fabricius, 1775  (the Palearctic and tropical Africa)

References

Further reading

 
 

Tenebrionoidea